The Kansas City metropolitan area is a bi-state metropolitan area anchored by Kansas City, Missouri. Its 14 counties straddle the border between the U.S. states of Missouri (9 counties) and Kansas (5 counties). With  and a population of more than 2.2 million people, it is the second-largest metropolitan area centered in Missouri (after Greater St. Louis) and is the largest metropolitan area in Kansas, though Wichita is the largest metropolitan area centered in Kansas. Alongside Kansas City, Missouri, these are the suburbs with populations above 100,000: Overland Park, Kansas; Kansas City, Kansas; Olathe, Kansas; Independence, Missouri; and Lee's Summit, Missouri.

Business enterprises and employers include Cerner Corporation (the largest, with almost 10,000 local employees and about 20,000 global employees), AT&T, BNSF Railway, GEICO, Asurion, T-Mobile (formerly Sprint), Black & Veatch, AMC Theatres, Citigroup, Garmin, Hallmark Cards, Waddell & Reed, H&R Block, General Motors, Honeywell, a Ford Motor Company factory, The Kansas City Star, Bayer, Children's Mercy Hospital, Truman Medical Center-Hospital Hill, and Andrews McMeel Universal (representing Garfield, Calvin and Hobbes, and Doonesbury). Shopping centers include City Market, Crown Center, Country Club Plaza, Independence Center, Legends Outlets Kansas City, Oak Park Mall, Ward Parkway Center, and Zona Rosa.

Cultural attractions include the American Jazz Museum, the Kansas City Symphony, Kansas City Union Station, the National World War I Museum, the Nelson-Atkins Museum of Art, the Kemper Museum of Contemporary Art, Kauffman Center for the Performing Arts, the National Agricultural Center and Hall of Fame, Arabia Steamboat Museum, Uptown Theater, Midland Theatre, the Kansas City Zoo, Swope Park (featuring Starlight Theater), Sandstone Amphitheater, the Kansas City Renaissance Festival, Worlds of Fun, Oceans of Fun, and several casinos. Major league sports franchises include the NFL's Kansas City Chiefs, the MLB's Kansas City Royals, and the MLS's Sporting Kansas City. The Kansas Speedway is owned by NASCAR.

Historic features include these: the confluence of the eastern endpoints of the California, Santa Fe, and Oregon Trails in Independence; the Harry S. Truman Historic District; and the neighborhoods of Westport, 18th and Vine, and Pendleton Heights. Historic cultural origins include KC styles of jazz, vaudeville theater, barbecue, and steak.

Geographic overview

The larger Kansas City Metropolitan Area as seen on a map can be visualized roughly as four quadrants:

The southeast quadrant includes Kansas City, Missouri, and surrounding areas in Missouri. It includes the notorious Grandview Triangle.

The southwest quadrant includes all of Johnson County, Kansas, which includes the towns in the area known as Shawnee Mission, Kansas. Interstate 35 runs diagonally through Johnson County, Kansas, from the southwest to downtown Kansas City, Missouri.

The northwest quadrant contains Wyandotte, and Leavenworth, counties in Kansas and parts of Platte County, Missouri. Wyandotte County, Kansas (sometimes referred to as just Wyandotte), contains Kansas City, Kansas; Bonner Springs, Kansas; and Edwardsville, Kansas; it is governed by a single unified government. Another bend in the Missouri River forms the county line between Wyandotte County, Kansas, and Platte County, Missouri, to the north and northeast.

The map's northeast quadrant is referred to as the Northland. It includes parts of Clay County, Missouri, including North Kansas City, Missouri and Parkville, Missouri. North Kansas City is bounded by a bend in the Missouri River that defines a border between Wyandotte County, Kansas, and Clay County, Missouri, running approximately North-South and a border between North Kansas City, Missouri, and Kansas City, Missouri, running approximately East-West. The river bend's sharpest part forms a peninsula containing the Kansas City Downtown Airport.

Divisions

Areas

 Downtown Kansas City is a section of western Kansas City, Missouri, where corporate offices and much of the city's entertainment facilities are located. The area has been undergoing a massive revitalization since 2000, and increased its population by over 7,000 people between 2000 and 2005. The Power and Light District, Historic Garment District, and the T-Mobile Center are in the downtown area.
 The Northland is a section of the metropolitan area north of the Missouri River, comprising Clay and Platte Counties in Missouri. This area includes the northern half of Kansas City, Missouri, which is referred to as Kansas City, North to distinguish it from the rest of the Northland and the city of North Kansas City.
 River Market is an area north of downtown, south of the Missouri River and west of Highway 9, and is home to a large farmer's market.
 North Kansas City is an enclaved city surrounded by Kansas City, Missouri.
 Shawnee Mission is a district created by the United States Postal Service that encompasses 16 cities and towns in northeast Johnson County, Kansas, most of which also lie in the school district of the same name.
 The Waldo Residential District (Waldo) is in Kansas City, Missouri, near 75th Street and Wornall Road.
 Country Club Plaza ("the Plaza") is an upscale shopping district built by the J.C. Nichols Company in 1923, and was the first suburban shopping district in the United States.
 The Country Club District is an associated group of neighborhoods built along Ward Parkway by J.C. Nichols, which is just south of the Country Club Plaza and includes Sunset Hill, Brookside, Crestwood, and Mission Hills, Kansas.
 39th Street (also referred to as the Volker neighborhood or "Restaurant Row") is a small section of West 39th Street between State Line Road and the Southwest Trafficway in Kansas City, Missouri. The area has many restaurants, bars and shops, and is just across the state line from the University of Kansas Medical Center.
 University of Kansas Hospital (KUMED) is the corporate name of the hospital on the KU Medical Center campus.
 Benton Curve is a curve at the cross-section of Interstate 70 and Benton Boulevard in Kansas City, Missouri; the area has long been prone to traffic accidents.
 Pendleton Heights is a neighborhood in the Historic Northeast district of Kansas City, Missouri, which is bordered by Cliff Drive to the north, Chestnut Trafficway to the east, Independence Avenue to the south, and The Paseo to the west. It is Kansas City's oldest surviving neighborhood, and has the city's largest concentration of Victorian homes.
 The Grandview Triangle is the intersection of four major highways: Interstate 435, Interstate 470, Interstate 49, and U.S. Route 71 (Bruce R. Watkins Drive). Notorious for fatal accidents, the Triangle has undergone improvements and upgrades in recent years.
 Emanuel Cleaver II Boulevard, named for former mayor and current Congressman Emanuel Cleaver, comprises recently renamed portions of 47th Street and Brush Creek Boulevard in Kansas City, Missouri.
 18th and Vine Historic District (18th and Vine) is a neighborhood on Kansas City, Missouri's north side that contains the Negro Leagues Baseball Museum and the American Jazz Museum. This area was the heart of Kansas City's black business district.
 The Library District is a recently defined district around the new Central Library at 14 West 10th Street in Kansas City, Missouri.
 135th Street (Overland Park, Kansas) is a shopping area featuring several indoor and outlet malls, restaurants, and two movie theaters.
 Prariefire is a modern shopping and leisure area featuring fine restaurants such as Cocobolos and The Brass Onion, and high-end bowling venue Pinstripes. The Museum of Prariefire is its main attraction.
 Strawberry Hill is a historical area in Kansas City, Kansas that was home to many eastern European immigrants. Later, the neighborhood became home to many Latino and Latino families.
 Hospital Hill is an area near 23rd Street and Holmes Avenue in Kansas City, Missouri, and consists of two major hospitals (University Health and the Children's Mercy Hospital) and the University of Missouri-Kansas City's School of Medicine, School of Dentistry, School of Pharmacy, and School of Nursing.
 Argentine is a neighborhood in Kansas City, Kansas, centered along Metropolitan and Strong avenues from 27th to 30th streets. It is one of the oldest Mexican/Latino neighborhoods in Kansas City, with Mexican immigration to that area starting in the 1800s.
 The Crossroads Arts District is a neighborhood in the downtown area between the Central Business District and Union Station, centered around the intersection of 19th Street and Baltimore Avenue in Kansas City, Missouri. It contains dozens of art galleries, and is considered to be the center of the arts culture in the metropolitan area. Local artists sponsor exhibits in the district on the first Friday of each month.
 Quality Hill is a residential and commercial neighborhood atop the bluff on the west side of the Central Business District of Downtown Kansas City, across the river from the Charles B. Wheeler Airport.
 Washington-Wheatley is a historically Black neighborhood southeast of the 18th and Vine Historical District.
 The Westside is a historically African American and Chicano/Latino neighborhood near Southwest Boulevard and Interstate 35.
 Westport is a historic district that includes the oldest building still standing in the city and that is home to much of the metropolitan area's entertainment and nightlife.
 Valentine is a neighborhood north of Westport that includes the historic Uptown Theater.
 West Bottoms has many of the oldest buildings and the former location of the city's stockyards. It is now known for its arts community, the American Royal, Hy-Vee Arena, antique stores, and First Fridays events.
 Rosedale is the southernmost district of Kansas City, Kansas, and the only part of that city whose streets are on the metropolitan grid. Home to the main hospital of the University of Kansas Health System, it was the last municipality absorbed by Kansas City, Kansas, prior to the creation of the Unified Government of Kansas City and Wyandotte County.
 Union Hill
 Armourdale is a residential and commercial neighborhood in Kansas City, Kansas, and is one of the historically Chicano(a) neighborhoods of the Kansas City metropolitan area.
 Sheffield is an industrial district in the Blue River valley on the city's far northeast side. 
 East Bottoms, also known as the Industrial District, is primarily known for its industrial businesses and railroad activity.
 Brookside is a pedestrian-friendly district built in the 1920s, centered on the Brookside Shopping District at 63rd Street and Brookside Boulevard.
 Hanover Heights is a small neighborhood in Kansas City, Kansas' Rosedale section that was once primarily noted for the antiques shops along 45th Avenue, with the neighborhood's boundaries running mainly between Rainbow Boulevard and State Line Road, running south of the KU Medical Center to the Johnson County border.
 The Historic Northeast District (Northeast) is a working-class immigrant collection of neighborhoods between downtown Kansas City and the suburb of Independence.
 The Truman Sports Complex, at the junction of I-70 and I-435 (east of downtown Kansas City, Missouri), is home to several professional sports attractions. It is anchored by Arrowhead Stadium, home of the Kansas City Chiefs NFL franchise; and Kauffman Stadium, home of Major League Baseball's Kansas City Royals.

Jackson County, Missouri

Downtown

Downtown Kansas City, Missouri has a population of 25,204. Downtown is Kansas City's historic center, located entirely within Kansas City, Missouri, and contains the city's original town site, business districts, and residential neighborhoods. Downtown is bounded by the Missouri River on the north, the Missouri-Kansas state line on the west, 31st Street on the south and Woodland Avenue on the east. The downtown area includes the Central Business District and its buildings, which form the city's skyline. The Downtown Loop is formed by Interstates 670, 70, and 35. Within the downtown loop are many of the tall buildings and skyscrapers that make up the city's skyline. The downtown loop also has small, distinct neighborhoods such as Quality Hill, the Garment District, the Financial District, the Convention Center District, and the Power and Light District.

Other nearby neighborhoods are River Market and Columbus Park, both located between the downtown loop and the Missouri River. Between the downtown loop and the state line are the Westside neighborhood and the West Bottoms, located at the bottom of the bluff adjacent to Kaw Point. East of the loop are the 18th & Vine District, the North Bottoms, and Northeast Kansas City (the East Bottoms, Northeast, and Pendleton Heights). South of the loop is the Crossroads District, Union Hill, Crown Center, Hospital Hill, Longfellow, Wendell Phillips, and Washington Wheatley.

The Kansas City Convention Center, Municipal Auditorium, City Hall, Lyric Theater, Midland Theatre, Ilus Davis Park, and Barney Allis Plaza are within the Central Business District inside the downtown loop. The T-Mobile Center and the College Basketball Experience are within the Power & Light District, also within the downtown loop. The Kauffman Center for the Performing Arts is perched upon a high point immediately south of the downtown loop. South of the loop is the Crossroads District, Union Station, Crown Center, the National World War I Museum, Liberty Memorial, Penn Valley Park, University Health Truman Medical Center, Children's Mercy Hospital, and the 18th & Vine District. North of the loop are City Market within the River Market and Richard L. Berkeley Riverfront Park. West of the loop within the West Bottoms are Hy-Vee Arena and Hale Arena.

Midtown/Plaza
Midtown/Plaza is entirely within Kansas City, Missouri with a population of 40,355. It is just south of downtown, and bounded by 31st Street on the north, the state line on the west, West Gregory Boulevard (71st Street) on the south, and Troost Avenue on the east. Midtown/Plaza, the core of the metropolitan area, has many cultural attractions, shopping and entertainment areas, large hospitals, universities, and the metro area's most densely populated neighborhoods.

Midtown/Plaza has many distinct and historic neighborhoods, including Westport, Hyde Park, and Southmoreland. Shopping is centered on the Country Club Plaza, which has luxury retailers, hotels, and restaurants. Brookside and Westport also contain smaller-scale, neighborhood-oriented, and niche-market retailers. Midtown is home to Saint Luke's Hospital of Kansas City and Research Medical Center. Cultural attractions include the Nelson-Atkins Museum of Art, Kemper Museum of Contemporary Art, Uptown Theater, Starlight Theater, the Kansas City Zoo, Loose Park, and Swope Park. The last of these has a soccer complex that is home to the Swope Park Rangers, a USL Championship team that is the official reserve side for the area's Major League Soccer club, Sporting Kansas City. Major educational institutions include the University of Missouri–Kansas City, Rockhurst University, Kansas City Art Institute, Stowers Institute for Medical Research, Midwest Research Institute, and Penn Valley Community College.

East Side
East Side of the Metro is primarily eastern Jackson County which is an area of the Kansas City Metro that contains the far-eastern urban side of Kansas City, Missouri and the following large suburbs of Blue Springs, Independence, and Lee's Summit. The area includes western Lafayette County Missouri and the far northeast portion of Cass County Missouri. The East Side of Metro includes the Missouri suburbs of Independence, Grandview,Blue Springs, Raytown, Lees Summit, Grain Valley, Oak Grove, Sugar Creek, River Bend, Lake Lotawana, Lone Jack, Greenwood, Unity Village, Buckner, Pleasant Hill, Bates City, Odessa, and Lake Tapawingo. Arrowhead Stadium, home of the NFL's Kansas City Chiefs and Kauffman Stadium, home of the MLB's Kansas City Royals are on the eastern edge of Kansas City. The Cable Dahmer Arena home of the ECHL's Kansas City Mavericks and the MASL's Kansas City Comets is in Independence.

Johnson County, Kansas
Johnson County, Kansas contains many municipalities with a population of 609,863. It has the largest economy in the metropolitan area and is the fastest growing county by total population. Municipalities include Overland Park, Olathe, Shawnee, Leawood, Lenexa, Prairie Village, Gardner, Merriam, Mission, Roeland Park, Fairway, Lake Quivira, Mission Hills, Mission Woods, Westwood, and Westwood Hills. Corporate headquarters include Garmin, Black & Veatch, and AMC Theatres, and the secondary headquarters of T-Mobile. Many local area attractions and shopping districts are in Johnson County, such as Oak Park Mall, Town Center Plaza, and Prairie Fire.

The Northland (Missouri)
The Northland is the area north of the Missouri River, bordered by the Kansas state line on the west. The southern half of Platte County, and much of Clay County make up the area. The Northland is a fast-growing, primarily suburban region of the metropolitan area, although much of it is contained within the city limits of Kansas City, Missouri. The economy of the Northland is dominated by Cerner, Kansas City International Airport, Ford Kansas City Assembly Plant, the Zona Rosa shopping community and three riverboat casinos. The metro area's largest amusement park, Worlds of Fun and Oceans of Fun, is in the Northland. Major educational institutions in the Northland include Park University, William Jewell College, and the Maple Woods campus of Metropolitan Community College. The Northland is also home to the popular recreational reservoir, Smithville Lake. Communities of the Northland outside the city limits include Parkville, Kearney, Liberty, Platte City, Gladstone, Riverside, Smithville, North Kansas City, and Weatherby Lake.

Wyandotte County, Kansas
Wyandotte County, Kansas has a population of 169,245 and contains Kansas City, Kansas, Bonner Springs, Kansas, and Edwardsville, Kansas. Kansas City, Kansas is locally called "KCK" to distinguish it from the larger Kansas City, Missouri (KCMO). It contains many residential neighborhoods, the Fairfax Industrial District, and the Village West entertainment district. The General Motors Fairfax Assembly Plant is in the Fairfax Industrial District. Village West contains many area attractions. This includes many sporting venues such as Children's Mercy Park, home of the area MLS soccer team Sporting Kansas City, the Kansas Speedway, which hosts many NASCAR races, and Field of Legends, home of the independent baseball team, the Kansas City Monarchs, and the Legends shopping district. Bonner Springs is home to the Azura Amphitheater (commonly known as the Sandstone Amphitheater), the National Agricultural Center and Hall of Fame, Wyandotte County Historical Museum, and the annual Kansas City Renaissance Festival.

Cass County, Missouri
Cass County, Missouri has a population of 107,824 and contains parts of "South Kansas City". This area consists of the most southern part of Kansas City, Missouri, and the suburbs of Harrisonville, Belton, Loch Lloyd, Peculiar, and Raymore.

Leavenworth County, Kansas
Leavenworth County, Kansas has a population of 81,881 and contains the cities of Leavenworth and Lansing, and the Leavenworth Federal Penitentiary.

Population

The Kansas City metropolitan area (MO-KS) population in 2018 was 2,106,632 and the Kansas City CSA in 2020 was 2,528,644.

More than 100,000

 Kansas City, Missouri – Pop: 508,090
 Overland Park, Kansas – Pop: 197,238
 Kansas City, Kansas – Pop: 156,607
 Olathe, Kansas – Pop: 141,290
 Independence, Missouri – Pop: 123,011
 Lee's Summit, Missouri – Pop: 101,108

50,000–99,999

 Shawnee, Kansas – Pop: 67,311
 Blue Springs, Missouri – Pop: 58,063
 Lenexa, Kansas – Pop: 57,434

20,000–49,999

 Leavenworth, Kansas – Pop: 37,351
 Leawood, Kansas – Pop: 33,902
 Liberty, Missouri – Pop: 30,167
 Raytown, Missouri – Pop: 30,012
 Gladstone, Missouri – Pop: 27,063
 Grandview, Missouri – Pop: 26,209
 Belton, Missouri – Pop: 23,953
 Gardner, Kansas – Pop: 23,287
 Prairie Village, Kansas – Pop: 22,957
 Raymore, Missouri – Pop: 22,941

10,000–19,999

 Grain Valley, Missouri – Pop: 15,627
 Ottawa, Kansas – Pop: 12,387
 Lansing, Kansas – Pop: 11,767
 Excelsior Springs, Missouri – Pop: 11,486
 Merriam, Kansas – Pop: 11,288
 Smithville, Missouri - Pop: 10,406

5,000–9,999

 Harrisonville, Missouri – Pop: 9,986
 Cameron, Missouri (partial) – Pop: 9,933
 Mission, Kansas – Pop: 9,491
 Kearney, Missouri – Pop: 9,423
 Pleasant Hill, Missouri – Pop: 8,289
 Oak Grove, Missouri – Pop: 7,937
 Bonner Springs, Kansas – Pop: 7,606
 Roeland Park, Kansas – Pop: 6,827
 Parkville, Missouri – Pop: 6,296
 De Soto, Kansas – Pop: 6,074
 Richmond, Missouri – Pop: 6,013
 Spring Hill, Kansas – Pop: 5,981
 Greenwood, Missouri – Pop: 5,569
 Paola, Kansas – Pop: 5,527
 Basehor, Kansas – Pop: 5,403
 Tonganoxie, Kansas – Pop: 5,248
 Odessa, Missouri – Pop: 5,178

Fewer than 5,000

 Peculiar, Missouri – Pop: 4,885
 Platte City, Missouri – Pop: 4,833
 Higginsville, Missouri – Pop: 4,662
 Lexington, Missouri – Pop: 4,598
 Edwardsville, Kansas – Pop: 4,390
 North Kansas City, Missouri – Pop: 4,354
 Osawatomie, Kansas – Pop: 4,297
 Louisburg, Kansas – Pop: 4,276
 Fairway, Kansas – Pop: 3,970
 Mission Hills, Kansas – Pop: 3,601
 Sugar Creek, Missouri – Pop: 3,320
 Riverside, Missouri – Pop: 3,150
 Buckner, Missouri – Pop: 3,067
 Pleasant Valley, Missouri – Pop: 3,056
 Lawson, Missouri – Pop: 2,409
 Plattsburg, Missouri – Pop: 2,291
 Lake Lotawana, Missouri – Pop: 2,018
 Weatherby Lake, Missouri – Pop: 1,848
 Wellsville, Kansas – Pop: 1,818
 Edgerton, Kansas – Pop: 1,736
 Westwood, Kansas – Pop: 1,719
 Hamilton, Missouri - Pop: 1,690
 Garden City, Missouri – Pop: 1,625
 Gower, Missouri (partial) – Pop: 1,526
 Claycomo, Missouri – Pop: 1,468
 Lone Jack, Missouri – Pop: 1,124
 Drexel, Missouri - Pop: 999
 Orrick, Missouri - Pop: 753
 Braymer, Missouri - Pop: 737
 Lake Tapawingo, Missouri - Pop: 723
 Glenaire, Missouri - Pop: 578
 Hardin, Missouri - Pop: 571
 Polo, Missouri - Pop: 509
 Dearborn, Missouri (partial) – Pop: 496
 Avondale, Missouri - Pop: 440
 Osborn, Missouri (partial) – Pop: 423
 Sibley, Missouri - Pop: 356
 Kingston, Missouri - Pop: 290
 Henrietta, Missouri - Pop: 278
 Breckenridge, Missouri - Pop: 258
 Camden, Missouri - Pop: 175
 Cowgill, Missouri - Pop: 168
 Oaks, Missouri - Pop: 129
 Fleming, Missouri - Pop: 114
 Unity Village, Missouri - Pop: 84
 Levasy, Missouri - Pop: 83
 Randolph, Missouri - Pop: 54
 River Bend, Missouri - Pop: 10

Counties
The MSA covers a total area of  including  of water.

Associated areas
Often associated with Kansas City, the cities of Lawrence, Kansas and Saint Joseph, Missouri are identified as separate Metropolitan Statistical Areas.

The Kansas City-Overland Park-Kansas City MO-KS (USA) Combined Statistical Area (CSA) encompasses the Metropolitan statistical areas (MSA) of Kansas City MO-KS, the St. Joseph metropolitan area and the Lawrence, Kansas metropolitan area with the Micropolitan Statistical Areas (μSA) of Warrensburg, Missouri, Atchison, Kansas, and Ottawa, Kansas. (Warrensburg is in Johnson County, Missouri. Atchison is in Atchison County, Kansas. Ottawa is in Franklin County, Kansas.) The combined statistical area covers a total area of  including  of water.

Politics

The Kansas City metro area is a swing metro area, going between the Republican and Democratic parties for decades.

Economy
, Missouri accounted for 56% of employment and Kansas accounted for 44% of employment. From 2018 to 2019 Kansas added 13,000 jobs and Missouri added 6,500 jobs. Kansas side employment grew by 2.7% and Missouri side employment grew by 1.1%;  job growth in Kansas was more than double that in Missouri. Professional and business employment growth was due entirely to a gain of 5,200 jobs in the Kansas portion of the metro area.

In 2015, the metropolitan area accounted for 40.9% of the total GDP in the state of Kansas and 22.7% of the total GDP in the state of Missouri.

Transportation

Highways
The Kansas City metropolitan area has more freeway lane miles per capita than any other large metropolitan area in the United States. This is 27% more than the second-place Dallas/Fort Worth Metroplex, 50% more than the average American metro area, and nearly 75% more than the large metro area with the least in Las Vegas.

Interstates
The Kansas City area is a confluence of four major U.S. interstate highways:
  – North to St. Joseph, Missouri
  – North to Des Moines, Iowa and south to Wichita, Kansas
  – South to Joplin
  – East to St. Louis and west to Topeka, Kansas

Other interstates that cross through the area include:
  – A bi-state loop through Jackson, Clay and Platte counties in Missouri and through Johnson and Wyandotte counties in Kansas. It is the second-longest single-numbered beltway in the U.S., and the fourth-longest in the world.
  – Connects South Kansas City with Lee's Summit and Independence.
  – Connects Johnson County and Kansas City, Kansas to I-29, I-70, and I-35.
  – A southern bypass of I-70 and the southern portion of the downtown loop. The roadway is designated on road signs as East I-70, when exiting from I-35 while traveling north.

US Highways
U.S. Highways serving the Kansas City Metro Area include these:
  – Running from Independence Ave. and Winner Rd., between downtown Kansas City and Independence, Missouri, it serves as a street-level connection to Independence.
  – U.S. 40 is one of six east-west U.S.-numbered routes that run (or ran) from coast to coast. It serves as a business loop and an alternate route for I-70.
  – Enters the area in southern Johnson County, follows I-435 from the west to I-470, then splits off of I-470 in Lee's Summit to continue eastward to Jefferson City and St. Louis as a regular highway. Its former route through Raytown and southeast Kansas City was renumbered as Route 350. U.S. 50 is also one of the six east-west highways that run coast-to-coast through the United States.
  - Enters the area concurrent with I-35 until the Shawnee Mission Parkway exit. It runs east along the Parkway into the Plaza area of Kansas City before terminating at US-71.
  – Connects Excelsior Springs, Missouri in the north and serves as a freeway in Johnson County Connecting I-35 to I-435 and connecting Overland Park to Louisburg and Linn Valley on the Kansas side.
  – In the north, concurrent with I-29 to Amazonia, Missouri, and serves as a freeway (Bruce R. Watkins Drive) south from downtown, joining with I-49 at the Grandview Triangle.
  – Connects Smithville, Missouri, in the north.

Kansas state highways
Kansas highways in the area include these:
  – A minor freeway bypassing the north of Kansas City, Kansas, connecting the GM Fairfax plant with I-635. K-5 continues as Leavenworth Road west to I-435 then on to Leavenworth, Kansas.
  – A freeway linking Leavenworth, Wyandotte and Johnson Counties in Kansas.
  – A freeway linking I-435 to De Soto and Lawrence.
  – A highway that links Lawrence to Wyandotte County in Kansas.

Missouri state highways
Missouri highways in the area include these:
  - An important state highway serving the eastern suburbs of the metro. Primarily running north and south through Jackson and Cass Counties. Connecting the following communities: Independence, Blue Springs, Lake Lotawana, Pleasant Hill and Harrisonville. It is the commercial backbone for Blue Springs, Lake Lotawana and Pleasant Hill.
  – A minor freeway northwest of North Kansas City, and serves as a commercial backbone to North Kansas City, Riverside, Platte Woods and Parkville.
  – Known as Tom Watson Parkway in the Kansas City vicinity until it intersects with I-435, it is a highway that spans 42 miles from I-29/US-71 to US-59/MO-273 in Lewis & Clark Village, Missouri. Its eastern segment is also known as NW 64th Street. The highway serves as a commercial backbone of Parkville, Missouri and runs across Riss Lake. The National Golf Club of Kansas City is located on MO-45.
  - A state highway serving the southern suburbs of Belton and Raymore.
  – This narrow and hilly road crosses the northern part of the metro, connecting Platte City, Smithville, Kearney, and Excelsior Springs.
  – A highway linking southern Lee's Summit and Grandview to the Kansas suburbs at State Line Road.
  – A freeway contained entirely in Kansas City's Northland, stretching from Liberty in Clay County west until it intersects with I-435 near Parkville, Missouri.
  – A minor freeway east of North Kansas City that, as a two-lane road, stretches to Richmond, Missouri.
  – Formerly an eastern bypass route of U.S. 71, this minor freeway connects Harrisonville and Lee's Summit to Independence, Sugar Creek, Liberty and Kansas City North. The roadway is designated on road signs alongside I-470 north of Lee's Summit.
  – This road crosses through Raytown as Blue Parkway.

Other roads
These are other notable roads:
 18th Street Expressway – a freeway carrying US-69 through central Wyandotte County from I-35 to I-70.
 Ward Parkway – A scenic parkway in Kansas City, Missouri, near the Kansas-Missouri state line, where many large historic mansions and fountains are located.
 Broadway – A street that runs from the west side of downtown Kansas City to Westport. The street has long been an entertainment center, with various bars, live jazz outlets, and restaurants along it. It also forms the eastern border of Quality Hill, one of the oldest neighborhoods in Kansas City.
 The Paseo – Part of the city's original system of parks and boulevards developed beginning in the late 1880s, it is the longest of the original boulevards, and the only one that runs the entire length of the pre-World War II city boundary, from the Missouri River bluffs in the north to 79th Street on the south.
 Shawnee Mission Parkway – Former alignment of K-10 from 1929 to 1983; K-58 from 1956 to 1979; US-56 from 1957 to 1968; K-12 from 1983 to 1998. Serves Shawnee Mission.
 Troost Avenue – A north-south thoroughfare 11 blocks east of Main Street, named for an early Kansas City settler and dentist, Benoist Troost. The street roughly divides the city's mostly black neighborhoods to its east from its mostly white ones to its west.
 Swope Parkway – Running on the south side of the Brush Creek valley eastward from The Paseo, then southward from its junction with Benton Boulevard, this street is the main route from the city's midtown to its largest city park, Swope Park.
 North Oak Trafficway – A major road in the Northland. The roadway is designated as MO-283 from MO-9 to I-29. It is a major road in the Northland and serves as the commercial backbone of Gladstone, Missouri.
 Barry Road – Runs along the former route of Military Road, which ran from Liberty to Fort Leavenworth. It is now a major commercial street in the Northland, although it has been paralleled by MO-152 for its entire route and has been effectively replaced by it east of Indiana Avenue.
 87th Street Parkway – A major parkway that extends from Overland Park to De Soto. Former alignment of K-10 from 1929 to 1983.

Street numbers
The Missouri side of the metropolitan area south of the Missouri River shares a grid system with Johnson County on the Kansas side. Most east-west streets are numbered and most north-south streets named. Addresses on east-west streets are numbered from Main Street in Kansas City, Missouri, and on north-south streets from St. John Avenue (or the Missouri River, in the River Market area). The direction 'South' in street and address numbers is generally implied if 'North' is not specified, except for numbered 'avenues' in North Kansas City. In the northland, east-west streets use the prefix N.E. or N.W., depending on the side of N. Main on which they lie.

Air
The Kansas City metropolitan area is served by several airports. Primary service is at Kansas City International Airport, 15 miles northwest of downtown Kansas City, Missouri, which had been built to serve as a global hub for the supersonic transport and Boeing 747 with gates positioned  from the street. However, since the September 11, 2001 attacks these have undergone expensive overhauls, retrofitting them to incorporate elements of conventional security systems.

The much smaller Charles B. Wheeler Downtown Airport, immediately north of downtown across the Missouri River, was the original headquarters of Trans World Airlines (TWA) and houses the Airline History Museum. It served as the area's major airport until 1972, when Kansas City International (then known as Mid-Continent International Airport and home to an Overhaul Base for TWA) became the primary airport for the metropolitan area after undergoing $150 million in upgrades that had been approved by voters in a 1966 bond issue. Downtown Airport is still used for general aviation and airshows.

Two general aviation airports are in Johnson County, Kansas. New Century AirCenter borders southwest Olathe and northeast Gardner. The primary runway at New Century AirCenter is the second longest runway in the region next to those at Kansas City International Airport. It is 7 miles from the Logistics Park Kansas City Intermodal Facility. Johnson County Executive Airport has one runway on 500 acres and is the fourth-busiest towered airport in the state of Kansas.

Rail
Kansas City is a freight hub served by the BNSF, Canadian Pacific, Kansas City Southern, Norfolk Southern, and Union Pacific. Kansas City Terminal Railway and Kaw River Railroad provide local interchange and switching service.

Amtrak Passenger service is centered at Kansas City, Missouri's Union Station and managed by the Kansas City Terminal. Daily long-distance services are Missouri River Runner with two round trips daily to Saint Louis, connecting to Chicago via the Lincoln Service; and Southwest Chief with daily service between Chicago and Los Angeles.

Transit
City buses operated by the Kansas City Area Transportation Authority (KCATA) provide most public transportation. The Metro Area Express (MAX) became Kansas City, Missouri's first bus rapid transit line in July 2005, and operates and is marketed akin to a rail system instead of a local bus line. The MAX links River Market, Downtown, Union Station, Crown Center, and Country Club Plaza. Buses in Johnson County, Kansas, are operated by Johnson County Transit, known as The JO.

The KC Streetcar is a 2.2-mile modern streetcar line in Downtown Kansas City. Opened to the public in May 2016, it is maintained and operated by the Kansas City Streetcar Authority, a non-profit corporation made up of private sector stakeholders and city appointees. A ballot initiative to fund construction of the  line was approved by voters on December 12, 2012. The system runs between River Market and Union Station, mostly along Main Street, with extensions north and south under consideration.

There are no commuter rail services.

Cultural attractions

Architecture

The architecture of Kansas City, Missouri, and the metropolitan area includes major works by many of the world's most distinguished architects and firms, including McKim, Mead and White; Jarvis Hunt; Wight and Wight; Graham, Anderson, Probst and White; Hoit, Price & Barnes; Frank Lloyd Wright; the Office of Mies van der Rohe; Barry Byrne; Edward Larrabee Barnes; Harry Weese; and Skidmore, Owings & Merrill.

 The KCTV-Tower is a  pyramid-shaped television and radio tower used primarily by local CBS affiliate KCTV (channel 5). It is at the corner of 31st and Main Streets, next to the studio facilities of PBS member station KCPT (which formerly housed the original studios of KCTV), and is visible from many parts of the city, especially at night due to the string of lights adorning the tower.
 The twin red-brick towers of the American Century Investments complex are oriented north and south along Main at 45th Street, just north of the Country Club Plaza (the Kemper Museum of Contemporary Art is slightly east, and the Nelson-Atkins Museum of Art is east and slightly south).
 Kansas City Community Christian Church, at 4601 Main Street, has a group of lights that shoot a beam upwards to the sky at night. Designed by Frank Lloyd Wright in the 1950s, it is slightly south of and across the street from the American Century Investment Towers (the Nelson Atkins is to the east, and the Kemper Museum is to the north and slightly east).
 Bartle Hall has a section that somewhat resembles a north-south suspension bridge, crossing over I-670 at the southwest corner of the downtown loop. It has four towers, with metal sculptures on top of each tower.
 The Veterans Affairs Medical Center, near the intersection of I-70, Linwood Boulevard and Van Brunt Boulevard, has a large "VA" emblem.
 The Kauffman Center for the Performing Arts, at 16th Street and Broadway (just south of the downtown loop), with its tiered glass and steel half-domes, has a design reminiscent of the world-famous Sydney Opera House.

Colleges and universities

Top 5 largest colleges by total enrollment (within the MSA)
1. Johnson County Community College - 18,638
2. Metropolitan Community College - 17,025
3. University of Missouri-Kansas City - 16,383
4. Park University - 9,512
5. Kansas Christian College (Overland Park) - 200

List of institutions (including those in the CSA):

 Avila University - Kansas City, MO
 Baker University - Baldwin City, KS
 Benedictine College - Atchison, KS
 Calvary University - Kansas City, MO
 Cleveland University-Kansas City - Kansas City, KS
 DeVry University - Kansas City, MO
 Donnelly College - Kansas City, KS
 Friends University - Lenexa, KS
 Graceland University - Independence, MO
 University of Arkansas Grantham - Lenexa, KS (administrative location)
 Haskell Indian Nations University - Lawrence, KS
 Johnson County Community College - Overland Park, KS
 Kansas Christian College - Overland Park, KS
 Kansas City Art Institute - Kansas City, MO
 Kansas City Kansas Community College - Kansas City, KS
 Kansas City University of Medicine and Biosciences - Kansas City, MO
  Kansas State University Olathe Innovation Campus - Olathe, KS
 Metropolitan Community College (Penn Valley, Maple Woods, Business and Technology Center, Blue River, and Longview) - Kansas City, MO
 MidAmerica Nazarene University - Olathe, KS
 Midwestern Baptist Theological Seminary - Kansas City, MO
 Missouri Western State University - St. Joseph, MO
 National American University - Kansas City, MO
 Nazarene Theological Seminary - Kansas City, MO
 Northwest Missouri State University - Maryville, MO
 Ottawa University - Overland Park, KS
 Park University - Parkville, MO
 Pinnacle Career Institute - Kansas City, KS
 Pittsburg State University - Lenexa, KS
 Rasmussen College - Overland Park, KS
 Rockhurst University - Kansas City, MO
 Saint Paul School of Theology - Leawood, KS
 University of Central Missouri - Warrensburg, MO
 University of Kansas - Lawrence, KS
 University of Kansas Edwards Campus - Overland Park, KS
 University of Kansas Medical Center - Kansas City, KS
 University of Missouri–Kansas City - Kansas City, MO
 University of Saint Mary - Leavenworth, KS
 Webster University - Webster Groves, MO
 William Jewell College - Liberty, MO

Libraries
The metro public library systems include Kansas City Public Library (Missouri), Mid-Continent Public Library, Kansas City, Kansas Public Library, and Johnson County Library. Private libraries include the Harry S. Truman Presidential Library and Museum and the Linda Hall Library.

Media

Print
The Kansas City Star is the metropolitan area's major daily newspaper. The McClatchy Company, which owns The Star, also owns two suburban weeklies: Lee's Summit Journal and Olathe Journal.

The Kansas City Kansan serves Wyandotte County, having moved from print to an online format in 2009. Additional weekly papers in the metropolitan area include the Liberty Tribune, Sun Newspapers of Johnson County, The Examiner in Independence and eastern Jackson County, The Pitch, and the Kansas-Missouri Sentinel. The faith-based newspapers are The Metro Voice Christian Newspaper and the Jewish Chronicle. Dos Mundos is a bilingual newspaper with articles in Spanish and English, and Mi Raza magazine is the area's only weekly Hispanic publication printed in Spanish. The Kansas City Call is an African American weekly newspaper.

Broadcast

According to Arbitron, about 1.5 million people over the age of 12 live within the Kansas City DMA, making it the 30th largest market for radio and 31st for television according to Nielsen. The Kansas City television and radio markets cover 32 counties encompassing northwestern Missouri and northeast Kansas.

Television
Television stations in the Kansas City metropolitan area, with all major network affiliates represented, include:
 WDAF-TV, channel 4 (Fox)
 KCTV, channel 5 (CBS)
 KMBC-TV, channel 9 (ABC)
 KTAJ-TV, channel 16 (TBN)
 KCPT, channel 19 (PBS)
 KUKC-LD, channel 20 (Univision)
 KCKS-LD, channel 25 (simulcast of sister station WROB-LD)
 KCWE, channel 29 (The CW)
 KSHB-TV, channel 41 (NBC)
 KMCI-TV, channel 38 (independent)
KGKC, Channel 39 (Telemundo Kansas City)
 KPXE-TV, channel 50 (Ion Television)
 KSMO-TV, channel 62 (MyNetworkTV)

The Kansas City television market is in very close proximity to two other media markets, St. Joseph and Topeka. As such, most of the television stations in the Kansas City area are receivable over-the-air in portions of both markets, including their principal cities; likewise, stations from Topeka are receivable as far east as Kansas City, Kansas and stations from St. Joseph are viewable as far south as Kansas City, Missouri's immediate northern suburbs.

Radio
Over 30 FM and 20 AM radio stations broadcast in the Kansas City area, with stations from Topeka, St. Joseph and Carrollton also reaching into the metropolitan area. The highest-rated radio stations, according to Arbitron are:
 WHB (810 AM) - Sports, ESPN Radio Affiliate
 KPRS (103.3 FM) – Urban
 KCMO-FM (94.9) – Classic Hits
 KQRC (98.9 FM) – Rock
 KRBZ-FM (96.5) – Alternative
 KMBZ (98.1 FM) – News/Talk
 WDAF-FM (106.5) – Country, Kansas City Chiefs flagship
 KZPT (99.7) - Adult Top 40
 KCSP (610 AM) - Sports, Kansas City Royals flagship
 KMXV (93.3) - Top 40
 KFKF (94.1) - Country
 KCFX (101.1) - Classic Rock
 KCHZ (95.7 FM) – Top 40/Rhythmic

Public and community radio
 KCUR (89.3 FM) – NPR affiliate
 KANU-FM (91.5) and KTBG (90.9 FM) – both college radio stations; also NPR affiliates
 KKFI (90.1 FM) – Locally owned not-for-profit station
 KGSP (1480 FM) – Park University college station

Specialty radio
Hispanics, who account for 8% of the market's population, are specifically served by three AM radio stations who broadcast in Spanish:
 KCZZ (1480 AM) – Spanish Sports (ESPN Deportes) talk
 KDTD (1340 AM) – Mexican regional
 KYYS (1250 AM) – Classic hits

Business interests
The Kansas City metropolitan area's largest private employer is Cerner Corporation. Cerner, a global healthcare IT company which is headquartered in North Kansas City, employs nearly 10,000 people in the area with a total workforce of nearly 20,000 people including global employees. In August 2014, the company announced its acquisition of competitor Siemens Healthcare. Cerner has several campuses across the area with its World Headquarters building in North Kansas City, Innovations Campus in South Kansas City, and Continuous Campus in Kansas City, Kansas.

Other major employers and business enterprises are AT&T, BNSF Railway, GEICO, Asurion, T-Mobile, Citigroup, EMBARQ, Farmers Insurance Group, Garmin, Hallmark Cards, Husqvarna, H&R Block, General Motors, Honeywell, Ford Motor Company, MillerCoors, State Street Corporation, The Kansas City Star, and Waddell & Reed, some of which are headquartered in the metropolitan area. Kansas City also has a large pharmaceutical industry, with companies such as Bayer and Aventis having a large presence.

Headquarters
These are among the largest companies and organizations, excluding educational institutions, that are headquartered in or have since relocated from the metropolitan area. Headquarters of most are located in Kansas City, Missouri.
 American Century Investments, an investment management firm
 AMC Theatres, a movie theater chain (Leawood, Kansas)
 Andrews McMeel Universal, a syndication and publication company which represents media/entertainment features such as Dear Abby, Garfield, Calvin and Hobbes and Doonesbury
 Applebee's, a restaurant chain (Lenexa, Kansas), relocated to Glendale, California in 2015
 BATS Global Markets, a stock exchange (Lenexa, Kansas)
 Black & Veatch Corporation, engineering firm (Overland Park, Kansas)
 CenturyLink (formerly Embarq Corporation), telecommunications company (headquarters in Monroe, Louisiana)
 Cerner, supplier of healthcare information technology solutions (North Kansas City, Missouri)
 Church of the Nazarene
 Commerce Bancshares, a bank serving Kansas, Missouri and Illinois
 Community of Christ, International Headquarters (Independence, Missouri)
 DST Systems, provider of information processing and computer software services and products
 Engineered Air, worldwide supplier and manufacturer of industrial air conditioners (De Soto)
 Fellowship of Christian Athletes (FCA)
 Ferrellgas, retailer and distributor of natural gas (Liberty, Missouri)
 FishNet Security, a provider of information security services and technology resale - Overland Park, KS
 Fort Dodge Animal Health, an animal health pharmaceutical and vaccine manufacturer and a division of Wyeth (Overland Park, Kansas)
 Freightquote.com, largest online third party logistics provider
 Garmin, largest maker of GPS-based electronics (Olathe, Kansas)
 Goodcents Subs and Pastas, notable midwest restaurant chain (De Soto)
 Hallmark Cards, largest maker of greeting cards in the U.S.
 HNTB Corporation, architectural and engineering firm
 H&R Block, financial corporation and former parent company of CompuServe, known mostly for their income tax preparation services
 Hostess Brands Maker of Twinkies and other snack cakes.
 Huhtamaki, makers of Chinet paper dinnerware (De Soto)
 Inergy, L.P., retailers and distributors of natural gas
 International Brotherhood of Boilermakers, Iron Ship Builders, Blacksmiths, Forgers and Helpers
 J. E. Dunn Construction Group, construction contractor
 Kansas City Board of Trade, a commodity futures and options exchange
 Kansas City Power and Light Company, a regulated provider of electricity and energy-related products and services
 Kansas City Southern Industries, operators of a Class I railroad
 Lockton Companies, the largest privately held insurance brokerage in the U.S.
 Merck Health Institutions, pharmaceutical corporation (De Soto)
 MK12 Studios, a filmmaking, animation, and design studio
 National Association of Intercollegiate Athletics (NAIA)
 Newport Television – privately held broadcasting company
 North Kansas City Hospital (North Kansas City, Missouri)
 People to People International, a voluntary organization founded by President Dwight Eisenhower
 Perceptive Software, makers of "Image NOW" software (Lenexa, Kansas)
 Polsinelli, AmLaw100-ranked national law firm
 Populous (formerly HOK Sport + Venue + Event), a major sports architectural firm
 Russell Stover Candies
 T-Mobile which is retaining the former Sprint campus as a secondary headquarters (Overland Park, Kansas)
 Tradebot, a high-frequency trading firm
 UMB Financial Corporation, a commercial bank serving a multi-state area of the Midwest
 Unity Church
 Veterans of Foreign Wars
 Waddell & Reed, an investment management and brokerage firm (Overland Park, Kansas)
 Walton Construction, a construction contractor
 YRC Worldwide Inc., known mostly from its former name and brand Yellow Freight, one of the largest transportation service providers in the world (Overland Park, Kansas)

The Kansas City Federal Reserve Bank is one of twelve such banks located in the United States.

Hospitals

 AdventHealth Shawnee Mission
 Centerpoint Medical Center
 Children's Mercy Hospital
 Kansas City Orthopaedic Institute
 Kansas City Veterans Affairs Hospital
 Kindred Hospital Kansas City
 Lee's Summit Medical Center
 Menorah Medical Center
 North Kansas City Hospital
 Olathe Medical Center
 Overland Park Regional Medical Center
 Providence Medical Center
 Research Medical Center
 St. Joseph Medical Center
 Saint Luke's Hospital of Kansas City
 Saint Luke's East Hospital
 Saint Luke's South Hospital
 St. Mary's Medical Center
 University Health Truman Medical Center
 University of Kansas Hospital (KU Med Center)

Shopping centers

 Adams Dairy Landing
 Blue Ridge Crossing
 Crown Center
 Country Club Plaza
 The Great Mall of the Great Plains (Demolished March 2017)
 Independence Center
 The Landing Mall
 Legends Outlets Kansas City
 Metcalf South Shopping Center (Demolished June/July 2017)
 Metro North Mall (Demolished 2016)
 Oak Park Mall
 Park Place
 Summit Fair
 Summit Woods Crossing
 Town Center Plaza
 Town Pavilion
 Ward Parkway Center
 Zona Rosa

Natural environment
The USDA provides estimates of the number of trees by county in the Kansas City metropolitan area.
Cass County, MO: 43,740,000
Miami County, KS: 38,700,000
Leavenworth County, KS: 33,210,000
Jackson County, MO: 32,540,000
Clay County, MO: 26,940,000
Johnson County, KS: 25,490,000
Ray County, MO: 22,710,000
Platte County, MO: 19,590,000
Wyandotte County, KS: 6,530,000
Total: 249,450,000

The five most common species in the region's urban and rural forest were American elm (28.9%), northern hackberry (14.0%), Osage-orange (7.2%), honeylocust (6.7%), and eastern redcedar (5.0%).

Local organizations
 Irish Museum and Cultural Center
 Congregation Beth Israel Abraham Voliner
 South Kansas City Chamber of Commerce
  Big Brothers Big Sisters of Greater Kansas City
 ArtsKC Regional Arts Council
 Central Exchange
 Shepherd's Center KC Central

Notable people
Many notable people through history were born in, or moved to, what is now the Kansas City metropolitan area.

The list from Kansas City, Missouri includes these: cartoonists Walt Disney, Friz Freleng, and Ub Iwerks; musicians Count Basie, Melissa Etheridge, and Eminem; Representative Emanuel Cleaver and historical city boss Tom Pendergast; actors Ellie Kemper, Don Cheadle, and Jason Sudeikis; reporter Walter Cronkite; pilot Amelia Earhart; and writer Ernest Hemingway. The list from Kansas City, Kansas includes actors Eric Stonestreet, Scott Foley, and Tuc Watkins; Kermit the Frog puppeteer Matt Vogel; West Side Story cinematographer Daniel L. Fapp; Marvel Comics writer Jason Aaron; sculptor and pioneering black pilot Ed Dwight, Jr.; Negro leagues player Ed Dwight, Sr.; and mass murderer Richard Hickock.

The list from Independence, Missouri includes President Harry S. Truman, Guns N' Roses keyboardist Chris Pitman, eSports player Jonathan Wendel, actor Arliss Howard, Devo co-founder Bob Lewis, self-freed slave and Oregon Trail pioneer Hiram Young, Pulitzer-winning historian David McCullough, actor Ginger Rogers, rapper Tech N9ne, fantasy novelist Margaret Weis, television series creator Paul Henning, and black female Civil War soldier Cathay Williams.

From Overland Park, Kansas, this includes film directors Michael Almereyda (Hamlet) and Darren Lynn Bousman (Saw), actors Rob Riggle and Tom Kane, economist and writer Michael R. Strain, and eSports player Johnathan Wendel. From Lenexa, Kansas, this includes actors Paul Rudd and Jason Wiles, gunfighter Wild Bill Hickok, and autism researcher William Shaw. From Olathe, Kansas, this includes George Washington Carver. From Lee's Summit, this includes Bob, Cole, Jim, and John of the James–Younger Gang.

See also

References

Further reading

 Shortridge, James R. Kansas City and How It Grew, 1822–2011 (University Press of Kansas; 2012) 248 pages; historical geography

External links 

 VisitKC.com
 DowntownKC.org
 2010 KC Census

 
Metropolitan areas of Missouri
Metropolitan areas of Kansas
Regions of Missouri
Regions of Kansas